Junaid Siddiqui (born 25 March 1985) is a Canadian national cricket player. He debuted in all formats of the game in the year 2011. Siddiqui started from school cricket in Mississauga and was a part of Under 14, Under 16, and Under 19 Teams, thus representing cricket locally, domestically as well as on an international Level. Siddiqui is one of the few Canadian home grown players who was picked to play first-class and List A games in Sri Lanka prior to being picked for the Canadian National Team.  He is a right-hand batsman who bowls legspin.
In January 2018, he was named in Canada's squad for the 2018 ICC World Cricket League Division Two tournament.

On 3 June 2018, he was selected to play for the Winnipeg Hawks in the players' draft for the inaugural edition of the Global T20 Canada tournament. In September 2018, he was named in Canada's squad for the 2018–19 ICC World Twenty20 Americas Qualifier tournament.

In August 2019, he was named in Canada's squad for the Regional Finals of the 2018–19 ICC T20 World Cup Americas Qualifier tournament. In October 2019, he was named in Canada's squad for the 2019 ICC T20 World Cup Qualifier tournament in the United Arab Emirates.

In October 2021, he was named in Canada's squad for the 2021 ICC Men's T20 World Cup Americas Qualifier tournament in Antigua. In February 2022, he was named in Canada's squad for the 2022 ICC Men's T20 World Cup Global Qualifier A tournament in Oman.

References

External links

1985 births
Living people
Canadian cricketers
Junaid
Junaid
Cricketers from Karachi
Antonians Sports Club cricketers
Canada One Day International cricketers
Canada Twenty20 International cricketers
Junaid